Malaysian National Projects are major national and giant projects which are important in the development of Malaysia.

This is a list of national projects from Malaysian independence in 1957 to the present.

1957–1963 

Stadium Merdeka
Klang Gates Dam
Stadium Negara
Parliament House
National Museum

1963–1970 
Subang International Airport
National Mosque
National Monument
East–West Highway
Angkasapuri

1971–1980 
Rural Development Projects under New Economic Policy including:
FELDA settlement
FELCRA settlement
Kedah territory (except Langkawi Island) (KEDA)
Penang territory (PERDA)
Kelantan South (KESEDAR)
Central Terengganu (KETENGAH)
Southeast Pahang (DARA)
Southeast Johor (KEJORA)
Kuantan Satellite Earth Station
Temenggor Dam
Karak Highway
KOMTAR Penang

1981–1990 
North–South Expressway
Penang Bridge
Kenyir Dam
Dayabumi Complex
Petronas petroleum and gas refinery in Kerteh, Terengganu
Sultan Ismail Power Station in Paka, Terengganu

1991–1999 

Peninsula Gas Pipeline
KTM Komuter
Kuala Lumpur Integrated Transit System, also known as Rapid KL
Kuala Lumpur International Airport
Petronas Twin Towers
Kuala Lumpur Tower
Putrajaya
Multimedia Super Corridor
Bakun Dam
Malaysia–Singapore Second Link
National Sports Complex
Double tracking and electrification of Rawang–Ipoh train line
Menara Alor Star
Kuala Lumpur Sentral (KL Sentral)

2000–2009 

KL Monorail
Express Rail Link
Stormwater Management and Road Tunnel (SMART Tunnel)
Southern International Gateway
East Coast Expressway (Phase 1)
South Johor Development Projects under South Johor Economic Region (SJER) or Wilayah Pembangunan Iskandar (Iskandar Development Region).
Northern Corridor Development Projects under Northern Corridor Economic Region (NCER)
East Coast Development Projects under East Coast Economic Region (ECER)
Sabah Development Projects under Sabah Development Corridor (SDC)
Central Sarawak Development Projects under Sarawak Corridor of Renewable Energy (SCORE)

2010–2019 
Kuala Lumpur International Airport 2 (klia2)
Double tracking and electrification of Ipoh–Padang Besar train line
Double tracking and electrification of Seremban–Gemas train line
Subang airport rail link
East Coast Expressway (Phase 2)
KVMRT Line 1 (Sungai Buloh–Kajang Line)
LRT extensions for Ampang, Sri Petaling and Kelana Jaya Lines
Penang Sentral
Rawang Bypass
JB Eastern Dispersal Link
Senai Desaru Expressway (SDE)
Sultan Abdul Halim Muadzam Shah Bridge (Penang Second Bridge)

2020-2030
Bandar Malaysia
Bukit Bintang City Centre
Forest City
Iskandar Waterfront City
JENDELA Plan
KL Metropolis
The River of Life KL
 Malaysia Vision Valley 2.0 (MVV2.0)
KK Resort City
Kuala Terengganu City Centre
Lok Kawi Resort City
Melaka Gateway
Melaka Waterfront Economic Zone (M-WEZ)
Merdeka 118 precinct
One Jesselton Waterfront
Penang South Islands
Saloma Link
Tun Razak Exchange
Widad Langkasuka
RAPID Pengerang
Central Spine Road
Pan Borneo Highway
Kuala Lumpur–Singapore High Speed Rail Line (Shelved)
 KVMRT Line 2 (Putrajaya Line)
LRT Shah Alam Line
MRL East Coast Rail Link
Double tracking and electrification of Gemas–Johor Bahru train line
Johor Bahru–Singapore Rapid Transit System
KVMRT 3 (MRT Circle Line)
Batang Lupar Sea Bridge Project
Damansara–Shah Alam Elevated Expressway (DASH)
East Klang Valley Expressway (EKVE)
Kota Bharu–Kuala Krai Expressway
Setiawangsa Pantai Expressway (DUKE Phase 3)
South Kedah Expressway (LEKAS)
Sungai Besi–Ulu Klang Elevated Expressway (SUKE)
Sarawak Sabah Link Road (SSLR)
West Coast Expressway
Penang Undersea Tunnel
Plaza Rakyat Redevelopment
Kampung Baru Development Plan
Tower M
Tradewinds Square Tower

Malaysian Public Works Department
Economy of Malaysia
History of Malaysia since Independence